Nse Bassey Ekpenyong  (1964 – 23 April 2022) was a Nigerian politician and member of the Nigerian National Assembly. Nse represented Oron, Mbo, Okobo, Urueoffong Oruku and Udung-Uko in the Federal House of Representatives.

Education 
Nse Bassey Ekpenyong attended St. Vincent Secondary School, Oti-Obor where he obtained his WASSCE and Abia State Polytechnic where he obtained his National Diploma in 2011.

Career 
Nse Ekpenyong was a one-term Akwa Ibom State House of Assembly member and the former state Deputy Chairman of PDP Akwa Ibom.

Forgery 
Nse Ekpenyong was arrested for allegedly forging his school certificates which he presented to INEC before commencement of elections. The interrogation, which took place in the capital of Rivers State Port Harcourt, for his connection to a N20 million electoral scam.

References 

1964 births
2022 deaths
Akwa Ibom State politicians
Members of the House of Representatives (Nigeria)
Members of the Peoples Democratic Party (Nigeria)